Bradley Motorsports was a racing team in the Indy Racing League owned by Colorado convenience store owner Brad Calkins.  His son, Buzz Calkins, drove the bright red cars shod in the livery of Bradley Food Marts, Brad Calkins' company. Bradley won the first IRL race in 1996 at Walt Disney World Speedway and were the co-champions of the inaugural IRL season. The team began in 1990, supporting Calkins' rise through the Indy Lights development series. After Calkins' retirement from the cockpit at the end of the 2001 season, the team ran a program in the first half of the 2002 season for Japanese pay driver Shigeaki Hattori, but following poor finishes, Hattori  left after the Pikes Peak International Raceway race. The team finished out the season unsponsored with Brazilian Raul Boesel driving in his final season of open wheel racing. Bradley Motorsports earlier had a pro super vee team in the mid and late 1980s that ran the Bradley Food Marts car driven by future RuSPORT co-owner Steve Wulff.

Complete IRL/IndyCar Series Results
(key) (Results in bold indicate pole position; results in italics indicate fastest lap)

  The 1999 VisionAire 500K was cancelled after 79 laps due to spectator fatalities.

External links

1990 establishments in Colorado
2002 disestablishments in the United States
IndyCar Series teams
Indy Lights teams
American auto racing teams